Titanophoneus ("titanic murderer") is an extinct genus of carnivorous dinocephalian therapsid from the Middle Permian. It is classified within the family Anteosauridae. The type species is Titanophoneus potens. Remains of Titanophoneus have been found at Isheevo in Russia.

Description
An adult skull would have reached 80 cm with a heavy long snout. The long tail and short limbs show the species to be a primitive therapsid unlike Inostrancevia which was more advanced. The structure of the limbs and the density of the bone are designed for a sprawling stance. The temporal opening is more advanced than Estemmenosuchidae but less advanced than Inostrancevia.

The teeth are large with 12 large palate incisors followed by 2 canines and various smaller back teeth. The lower palate is the same as the upper but without the canine teeth. The appearance of Titanophoneus is reminiscent to the sphenacodontid pelycosaurs, which included Dimetrodon.

Gallery

See also

 List of therapsids

References

External links
Taxonomy

Anteosaurs
Prehistoric therapsid genera
Prehistoric synapsids of Europe
Fossil taxa described in 1938
Taxa named by Ivan Yefremov